The Love Hypothesis is a romance novel by Ali Hazelwood, published September 14, 2021 by Berkley Books. An upcoming film based on the novel is coming from Bisous Pictures.

Synopsis 
The Love Hypothesis follows the main character Olive in trying to convince her best friend, Anh into thinking that her dating life is going great. In order to convince Anh, she pretends to date her coworker, Adam. Olive and Adam try to convince everyone around them they are in love. But while convincing everyone, they forget that their feelings are supposed to be fake. How long will it take for Olive and Adam to realize that they don't want to pretend anymore?

Reception 
The Love Hypothesis is a New York Times best seller.

The book received a starred review from Library Journal and positive reviews from Entertainment Weekly, Shelf Awareness, and Publishers Weekly. Kirkus Reviews provided a mixed review.

In 2021, the book was a finalist in the Goodreads Choice Awards for Romance, coming in second place behind People We Meet on Vacation with 683 fewer votes out of 435,858 votes total.

References 

Berkley Books books
American romance novels
2021 American novels